The modifier letter left half ring ( ʿ ) is a character of the Unicode Spacing Modifier Letters range, used to transliterate the letter ayin, representing the sound .

See also
 Modifier letter right half ring
 Half ring
 Apostrophe
 Glottal stop
 Glottal stop (letter)
 Spiritus asper

Phonetic transcription symbols